"Like I Love Country Music" is a song by American country music singer Kane Brown. It was released to country radio on May 6, 2022, and is the second single from Brown's third studio album Different Man.

History
Brown announced the release of "Like I Love Country Music" on April 19, 2022 via an Instagram post he made with his daughter. He had originally wanted to release the ballad "Leave You Alone" as a single, but decided that song was "too slow". Brown had originally written the song in 2019 and included a snippet of it on his Twitter account at the time.

Lyrically, "Like I Love Country Music" references country music songs, such as "Brand New Man" by Brooks & Dunn. Ronnie Dunn makes a vocal cameo on the song.

The song was officially released to radio on May 6, 2022. Brown co-wrote it with Jordan Schmidt, Taylor Phillips, and Matt McGinn during a songwriting retreat in 2019. Brown was originally going to release it on his 2020 extended play Mixtape, Vol. 1, but told the blog Country Now that he "lost interest" in the song. After listening to his recording again, he regained interest in the song and thus chose to release it as a single.

Music video
The song's corresponding music video features Brown performing the song before patrons of a honky-tonk, while wearing a cowboy hat, leather pants, and vest.

Charts

Weekly charts

Year-end charts

References

2022 songs
2022 singles
Kane Brown songs
Song recordings produced by Dann Huff
RCA Records singles
Songs written by Kane Brown
Songs written by Matt McGinn (songwriter)
Songs written by Jordan Schmidt
Songs written by Taylor Phillips (songwriter)
Songs about country music